Kiatisak Jiamudom (born January 11, 1995) is a Thai professional footballer who plays as a left back for Thai League 1 club Ratchaburi Mitr Phol.

External links

1995 births
Living people
Kiatisak Jiamudom
Kiatisak Jiamudom
Association football midfielders
Kiatisak Jiamudom
Kiatisak Jiamudom
Kiatisak Jiamudom
Kiatisak Jiamudom